Elizabeth Price (born 6 November 1966) is a British artist who won the Turner Prize in 2012. She is a former member of indie pop bands Talulah Gosh and The Carousel.

Biography
Price was born in Bradford, West Yorkshire. She was raised in Luton and studied at Putteridge High School before moving on to The Ruskin School of Drawing and Fine Art at the University of Oxford as a member of Jesus College. She continued her studies at the Royal College of Art in London, where she completed her MFA, and in 1999 she received her PhD in Fine Art from the University of Leeds.

In 1986 Price was a founder of the Oxford-based indie pop band, Talulah Gosh, in which she was one of the singers. The band became defunct in 1988.

In 2005 Price was awarded a Stanley Picker Fellowship at Kingston University, London. In 2012 Price was in residence at Wysing Arts Centre. In 2012 (until 2013) she became the first artist-in-residence at the Rutherford Appleton Space Laboratory in Oxfordshire.

Price was nominated for the 2012 Turner Prize for her solo exhibition 'HERE' at the Baltic Centre for Contemporary Art in Gateshead, where three video works were displayed: User Group Disco (2009), The Choir (2012) and West Hinder (2012). The 2012 Turner Prize exhibition at Tate Britain featured her twenty-minute video installation The Woolworths Choir of 1979 (which includes elements from The Choir), for which she was awarded the prize on 3 December 2012. The Guardian art critic declared the "focus and drive of Price's work, the cutting and the atmosphere, mark her out".

Price says her videos take a year to make. She explained "I use digital video to try and explore the divergent forces that are at play when you bring so many different technological histories together... I’m interested in the medium of video as something you experience sensually as well as something you might recognise."

See also
 List of Turner Prize winners and nominees

References

1966 births
Living people
20th-century English women artists
21st-century English women artists
Alumni of Jesus College, Oxford
Alumni of the Royal College of Art
Alumni of the Ruskin School of Art
Alumni of the University of Leeds
Artists from Bradford
English contemporary artists
People from Luton
Turner Prize winners
Women installation artists
Women video artists